The siege of Le Catelet, also known as the Capture of Le Catelet, took place at the stronghold of Le Catelet, in Picardy, between 20 and 26 June 1595, as part of the Franco-Spanish War (1595-1598) in the context of the French Wars of Religion. After a short siege, the Spanish forces commanded by the new Governor-General of the Spanish Netherlands, Don Pedro Henríquez de Acevedo, Count of Fuentes (Spanish: Conde de Fuentes), took the French fortress, compelling its garrison to surrender, as part of his offensive of 1595. A few days later the Count of Fuentes and his forces continued with the offensive and took La Capelle. On 14 July they arrived at Doullens and laid siege to the city.

See also
 Siege of Doullens
 French Wars of Religion
 Catholic League of France
 List of Governors of the Spanish Netherlands

Notes

References
 Demarsy, Arthur. La prise de Doullens par les Espagnols en 1595. Paris. 1867. 
 Knecht, Robert J. (1996). The French Wars of Religion 1559–1598. Seminar Studies in History (2nd ed.). New York: Longman. 
 John H. Elliott (2001). Europa en la época de Felipe II, 1559-1598. Barcelona: Editorial Crítica.   
 R. B. Wernham. The Return of the Armadas: The Last Years of the Elizabethan War against Spain 1595-1603. Oxford University Press. 1994.

External links
La prise de Doullens par les Espagnols en 1595 by Arthur Demarsy 

Le Catelet
Le Catelet
Le Catelet
Battles in Hauts-de-France
History of Aisne
Conflicts in 1595
1595 in France